The mainland drill (Mandrillus leucophaeus leucophaeus) is a subspecies of the endangered drill. It is distinguished by ringed yellow and black coloring on its crown, and is otherwise similar to the Bioko drill.

References

Mandrillus
Primates of Africa
Endangered animals
Endangered biota of Africa
Taxa named by Frédéric Cuvier